Filippaioi is a village and a former community in Grevena regional unit, West Macedonia, Greece. Since the 2011 local government reform it is part of the municipality Grevena, of which it is a municipal unit. The village of Filippaioi has 145 inhabitants, while the community had 179 inhabitants. The community consists of the villages of Filippaioi, Aetia (population 34) and the uninhabited settlement of Kourouna. The municipal unit has an area of 25.517 km2.

References

Populated places in Grevena (regional unit)
Former municipalities in Western Macedonia